KFXO-CD (channel 39) is a low-power, Class A television station in Bend, Oregon, United States, serving as the Fox affiliate for Central Oregon. It is owned by the News-Press & Gazette Company (NPG) alongside dual NBC/CW+ affiliate KTVZ (channel 21) and low-power Telemundo affiliate KQRE-LD (channel 20). The stations share studios on Northwest O. B. Riley Road in Bend, while KFXO-CD's transmitter is located on Awbrey Butte west of US 97. There is no separate website for KFXO-CD; instead, it is integrated with that of sister station KTVZ.

In addition to its own digital signal, KFXO-CD is simulcast in standard definition on KTVZ's third digital subchannel (21.3) from the same transmitter site.

History
The station began as K39DU on November 17, 1993 as a translator of Fox affiliate KPDX in Portland (then owned by First Media). On December 18, 1995, it upgraded to low-power level and became KFXO-LP. The Meredith Corporation acquired KFXO-LP and KPDX in 1997 when the company bought out First Media. In 2002 when KPDX became a UPN affiliate, KFXO-LP became its own self-sufficient station although some common operations between the two continued. On December 31, 2008, the retransmission agreement with local cable provider BendBroadband expired. Consequently, local viewers had to view the station using broadcast signals. Just before kickoff of the Fiesta Bowl on January 5, 2009, BendBroadband and KFXO-LP successfully negotiated a retransmission agreement that returned its signal to the cable provider in time for the game.

In late 2006, it was announced that Meredith would sell KFXO-LP to the News-Press & Gazette Company which occurred on May 24, 2007. BendBroadband filed a petition with Federal Communications Commission (FCC) to block the proposed sale but it was still approved. The channel has a construction permit which allowed it to perform a "flash-cut" to digital and upgrade to Class A level. It was not required by law to make the transition on June 12, 2009 because of its low-powered status. On July 19, 2011, the station began broadcasting in digital, and changed its calls to KFXO-CD.

Newscasts
In 2002, the simulcast of KPDX's newscasts (by then canceled) were replaced with those of sister station and new Portland Fox affiliate KPTV. In January 2006, this was dropped in favor of KFXO-LP's own separate news department which offered an hour-long prime time broadcast weeknights at 10. On June 22, 2007, the show was replaced by one produced by KTVZ. It was then reduced to a half-hour and expanded to seven nights a week. In September 2007, KTVZ began to air its newscasts in 16:9 widescreen enhanced definition and the broadcast on KFXO-LP was included. While not true high definition, it matches the ratio of HD television screens. At some point in time, KTVZ began producing a two-hour extension of its weekday morning show on this station. As of October 14, 2013, the weekday edition of NewsChannel 21, First at 10:00 on FOX Central Oregon has been expanded to an hour. The weekend edition remains a half-hour and the extended portion of the weekday morning show on KFXO-CD is now a rebroadcast of KTVZ's weekday morning show.

Technical information

Subchannels
The station's digital signal is multiplexed:

Translators
KFXO-CD is rebroadcast on the following translator stations:

 Bend (Grizzly Mountain):  20
 Montgomery Ranch, etc.:

References

Meredith Finalizes Sale of KFXO-LP to NPG of Oregon Meredith Corp. Press Release. May 25, 2007
Meredith sells Bend station Portland Business Journal. May 25, 2007

External links
KTVZ "NewsChannel 21"

Fox network affiliates
Low-power television stations in the United States
FXO-CD
News-Press & Gazette Company
1993 establishments in Oregon
Television channels and stations established in 1993